Elgazi is a village in the Ovacık District, Tunceli Province, Turkey. The village is populated by Kurds of the Bahtiyar tribe and had a population of 18 in 2021.

The hamlets of Alikomu, Aşağıasmacık, Doğanca, Herge and Yukarıasmacık are attached to the village.

References 

Kurdish settlements in Tunceli Province
Villages in Ovacık District